The 2018–19 Algerian Cup was the 54th edition of the Algerian Cup. The winner qualified for the 2019–20 CAF Confederation Cup, The final was be played in July 5, 1962 Stadium. CR Belouizdad were the eventual winners.

Teams

Regional rounds

Fourth regional round

These are the results of the last regional rounds played on 23–25 November 2018.

Ligue Régionale de Football d'Alger

Ligue Régionale de Football d'Oran

Ligue Régionale de Football de Blida

National rounds

Round of 64

Round of 32

Round of 16

Quarter-finals

Semi-finals

Final

References

External links 
National compétitions - LFP official website

Algerian Cup
Algerian Cup
Algeria